Latrodectus umbukwane, commonly known as the  Phinda button spider, is a species of the spider in the genus Latrodectus described in 2019, named after the Phinda Private Game Reserve where research specimens were collected. , it is known only from critically endangered sand forest environments in northern Zululand, KwaZulu-Natal, South Africa. It is believed to be the largest member of its genus.

Discovery
A single female was first found in 2014 in the Tembe Elephant Park. It was observed until its natural death two years later, when it was collected and sent to a laboratory. In 2017 a professional entomologist joined the study and a number of live specimens were collected from the Phinda reserve. They and their offspring were studied until 2019 when it was confirmed to be a new species. The first addition in 28 years to the 31 previously known button, or widow spiders in the genus Latrodectus, of which eight are found in Africa.

Description
Females have red markings on both the ventral and dorsal surfaces of the abdomen, unlike any other African Latrodectus species. They have parallel spermathecae and the copulatory ducts have three loops. The embolus of males has four loops and there are white markings on the ventral surface of the abdomen that darken with age. The large smooth egg sacs are bright purple when freshly laid, fading to shiny grey as they dry.

Habitat
The species is only known to occur in the critically endangered lowland sand forest biome of northern KwaZulu-Natal. These forests are threatened by illegal clearing for farming as well as wood collection. The females build nests in trees and stumps more than 50 centimetres above ground, which is higher than most other members of the genus.

References

External links
 Video clip filmed in early 2019

umbukwane
Spiders described in 2019
Spiders of South Africa
Endemic fauna of South Africa